Little Jimmy, originally titled Jimmy, is a newspaper comic strip created by Jimmy Swinnerton. With a publication history from February 14, 1904, to April 27, 1958, it was one of the first continuing features and one of the longest running.

Characters and story
The title character was a little boy who was constantly forgetting what he was supposed to do and ended up getting into trouble. As comics historian Don Markstein described:

The strip first appeared sporadically in The New York Journal. It soon became a regular in the Sunday comics section and was picked up as a feature in other newspapers owned by William Randolph Hearst. When King Features Syndicate was created in 1915, Little Jimmy went into nationwide syndication. In 1920, a daily strip was added and ran until the late 1930s. The Sunday strip continued until Swinnerton retired in 1958.

Markstein noted that Swinnerton "drew his strip in a clear, open style, unlike most cartoonists of his time. In this, he anticipated dominant styles of the 20th century, less crowded and more easily read — quite appropriate for newsprint production, where the printing isn't always as clear as it should be."

The Sunday page included several toppers over the course of the strip: Mr. Jack, a revival of a previous Swinnerton strip (January 24, 1926 - 1935), Li'l Ole Orvie and Oh, Yeah? (both 1935–1937), and Funny Films (November 1943 - 1944).

Animation
Little Jimmy appeared in the 1936 Betty Boop film Betty Boop and Little Jimmy.

Legacy
Little Jimmy Camp in the Angeles National Forest, near Los Angeles, California, is named after the comic strip in honor of Swinnerton, who often stayed there during the summers of 1908 and 1909.

References

External links
Coulton Waugh: The Comics

1904 comics debuts
1958 comics endings
American comics characters
American comic strips
Child characters in comics
Male characters in comics
Comics adapted into animated series
Comics set in the United States
Gag-a-day comics
Comics characters introduced in 1904
Public domain comics